Alexandra Issayeva (born 14 July 1982) is a retired Kazakhstani volleyball player. She was part of the Kazakhstan women's national volleyball team.

She participated in the 2010 FIVB Volleyball Women's World Championship.
 She played with Rabita Baku.

Clubs
  Rabita Baku (2010)

References

1982 births
Living people
Kazakhstani women's volleyball players
Place of birth missing (living people)
21st-century Kazakhstani women